Pontiac is a city in Livingston County, Illinois, United States. The population was 11,150 at the 2020 census. It is the county seat of Livingston County. The town is also the setting of the 1984 movie Grandview, U.S.A.

Geography

Location

Most of the land adjacent to Pontiac is farm ground.

Pontiac lies on the Vermilion River. On December 4, 1982, Pontiac had the worst flood in the town's history, cresting at 19.16 feet. The most recent flooding occurred on January 9, 2008, cresting at 18.85 feet, the second worst in the town history.

Climate

History

Slow beginnings
Pontiac was laid out on 27 July 1837 by Henry Weed and brothers Lucius Young and Seth M. Young. A small group of people gathered at the cabin of Andrew McMillan on the banks of the Vermilion River. Their plan was to create a seat for the newly established county of Livingston. The town they would design was nearly the last of hundreds of new towns laid out in Illinois between 1835 and 1837. Livingston County, which had only been created five months before, as yet had almost no functioning government. Illinois, like the rest of the nation, was fast slipping into a profound depression that would soon lead the next decade to be called “the hungry forties.”  Moreover, the men had been forced to guarantee a great deal in order to be granted the right to find the seat of the new county. They had agreed to donate twenty acres of land for a courthouse, another acre for a jail, and a pen for stray livestock. They had agreed to give the new county $3,000 toward erecting new buildings, to erect “a good and substantial wagon bridge" across the Vermilion River, and to build a county courthouse. None had the ready cash to support such an effort. They had simply promised to do so, and their promises were guaranteed by three others: C. H. Perry, the county's first storekeeper; James McKee, who had in interest at a mill at the new town site; and Jesse W. Fell, an Illinois legislator and Bloomington land dealer. Fell was the person who had been responsible for creating the new county. As it turned out, for the town's three founders, the future of Pontiac would not be their problem. Within five weeks of the founding of the town both Young brothers would be dead and Henry Weed soon drifted away and would die of pneumonia in 1842 while working on a railroad near Binghamton, New York. The men who founded Pontiac would not be its developers.

The design of Pontiac
The design of the Original Town would prove to be one of Pontiac's most enduring features. It was typical of Midwestern town plats in the 1830s. Since there were neither improved roads nor railroads, the plan was centered on a town square; such squares would become much less common after the arrival of railroads. In these early towns the public square served to define the town center and therefore to establish the location of the highest value lots. Isaac Wicher, the County Surveyor, made the initial survey of Pontiac and staked out its streets and lots. Pontiac was the only town laid out in Livingston County in the 1830s, but similar square-centered towns from this time can be found at Metamora, Lexington, Danvers, Clinton, and Le Roy, all established within two years of Pontiac. The Original Town of Pontiac differed somewhat from these others because it was unusually large, with ninety-three blocks, most divided into eight lots with some left unsubdivided. The new town extended on both sides of the river. The square, where the courthouse would be built, was bounded by Washington, Madison, Main and Mill Streets. At first lots were sold for as little as five dollars each and, even as late as 1850, good lots could be had for as little as twenty dollars each.Naming and first attempt to take away the county seat
Jesse W. Fell would help Pontiac in many ways. The first was providing a name. He had been asked to use his influence to establish a post office in the area. In order to do this, he needed a name and selected “Pontiac” in honor of the Native American leader, who as far anyone knew had never set foot in the area that would be Livingston County. Fell had also selected the name of Livingston County. The town did have a few advantages. It was a good place to cross the river, there was a good mill seat, and James McKee was working to establish a sawmill on the Vermilion at the town site. By 1838 the mill was in operation. Before leaving the county, Seth Weed had made a contribution to the town by building the first house in Pontiac. After the Young brothers' deaths, Isaac Fellows came west to settle their estate. He liked the location and took up residence. Work started on the courthouse, but was far behind schedule. Early growth was painfully slow, so slow that rivals decided there was a good chance they could strip the honor and the business of the county seat from Pontiac. In 1839 they forced the matter to a vote. The case against Pontiac appeared to be solid. The proprietors of Pontiac, they argued, had not lived up to their obligations: the courthouse was unfinished and no bridge across the Vermilion had been built. Their new location for the seat of Government of Livingston County, four or five miles upstream would, they said, be more centrally located. They complained that the site of Pontiac had been poorly chosen and was low, damp, and generally unhealthy. The people of the county agreed. By a margin of 81 to 56 they voted to move the county seat. A two-thirds majority was needed to re-locate a county seat, and by a small margin, Pontiac was able to continue to be the location of the county offices. After considerable delay, the first Courthouse, a twenty-two by thirty-foot wooden building, was finished and, in 1847, the promised bridge across the Vermilion was at last done. Alas, just after the $450 bridge was opened, a sudden rise in the Vermilion swept it away.

Second attempt to displace Pontiac
The future of Pontiac was still doubtful.  The 1878 History of Livingston County remarked, “the town of Pontiac was little more than a name.” In the early 1840s it still had only a half dozen cabins, an unfinished courthouse, and everything was so scattered among “clumps of bushes” that the town was almost invisible. In 1848 August Fellows, who now owned much of the town, had managed to set up a hostelry. It became a popular stopping place. Some of the first church services in Pontiac were held at the tavern. Fellows was no luckier than his in-laws had been ten years earlier. In 1849 Cholera swept through Pontiac, killing Fellows and two of his children. One early settler remembered that in Livingston County one person in two suffered from the dreaded disease. Fellow's widow, Maria Tracey Fellows, continued to run the hotel; she remarried Nelson Buck in 1850 and renamed the place Buck Hotel. In 1851 there was a second attempt to displace Pontiac. On 23 June 1851 a town called Richmond was platted two miles east of Pontiac.  Its backers included powerful local business and political figures. These men had calculated that the new Chicago and Mississippi Railroad would miss Pontiac and would have to cross the Vermilion River at their location. Stores, shops, and a schoolhouse were built at Richmond. However, the Richmond speculators had not reckoned with Jesse W. Fell, who had retained a strong economic and social interest in Pontiac and had important friends among the railroad officials. The tracks missed Richmond and passed through Pontiac, with the station located in Fell's First Addition to the town. Richmond was quickly abandoned; some of its buildings were moved to Pontiac. On the Fourth of July 1854 an exhibition train steamed into Pontiac and a few months later regular service on the railroad, soon to be known as the Chicago and Alton, began. Pontiac had survived.

Years of rapid growth
Suddenly, Pontiac was a boom town. People flooded in and money for improvements was available.  In 1856 Pontiac was officially incorporated.  By 1866 the people of Livingston County could afford to spend $18,000 to construct a new stone jail in Pontiac. In 1870 the state established the Reform School at Pontiac. It was to be a model correctional institution for boys. Jesse W. Fell donated sixty-four acres, valued at $10,000, and more land was purchased. Livingston County issued $50,000 in bonds. The town of Pontiac added another $25,000 in bonds and the first buildings were constructed. In 1892 this facility became the Illinois State Reformatory and is now the Pontiac Correctional Center. In 1870 a fire destroyed $50,000 worth of buildings in downtown Pontiac and, like many Illinois towns, the town fathers, spurred on by insurance companies, created a “fire district,” a zone in the commercial part of the city where buildings had to be constructed of brick or some other fireproof material. These districts make Pontiac a classic example of one of the key visual features of the American Midwest: towns with brick commercial districts surrounded by wooden residences. Rebuilding was rapid. Growth continued. In 1871 The Chicago and Paducah Railroad was built with the aid of local bonds. By 1877 the new railroad was doing $21,600 worth of business, while the older Chicago and Alton Railroad was handling $61,578 worth of goods. A second and larger courthouse was built. During Independence Day celebrations on 4 July 1874, stray fireworks started a blaze which burned the courthouse, the Union Block, and the Phoenix Block. Undaunted, Livingston County set out to find the best possible architect to design a new and more splendid building. They settled on J.C. Cochrane, known for his work on the Capitol building in Springfield and for the Richland County courthouse. The building was finished in 1875 and was placed on the National Register of Historic Places in 1986.

Continued growth
By 1880 no one could doubt that Pontiac was a success. Improvements continued at a rapid pace. The first electric lights were installed in 1882. In 1891 the old wooden bridge over the Vermilion was replaced by an iron span. In 1892 Pontiac built a municipal water works. Between 1875 and 1900 new buildings were erected around the courthouse square. From its beginnings Pontiac had been a political town and it would remain one. Abraham Lincoln visited Pontiac in the 1840s and again in February 1855, when his train was snowbound on the nearby tracks, and he was taken by sled to spend the night at the home of Mr. John McGregor. On 25 January 1860 Lincoln was again in town when he addressed the Young Men's Literary Association. In 1858 Stephen A. Douglas and Owen Lovejoy, the famous abolitionist, both visited Pontiac. In 1880, when local people learned that former president Ulysses S. Grant would pass through Pontiac on his way to visit his son, they begged the general to stay over for breakfast, and a large reception committee quickly arranged a celebration. William Jennings Bryan came to Pontiac on 27 October 1896 and returned on several other occasions. On 3 June 1903, during his whistle stop tour through central Illinois, Theodore Roosevelt spoke in Pontiac and unveiled the soldier's monument.  He spoke there again in 1910.

Automobile age
In the American Midwest new highways often parallel early railroads. This happened at Pontiac. The Chicago Mississippi, linking St. Louis with Chicago, was Pontiac's first railroad. In 1922 and 1923, Route 4, the first paved highway between Chicago and St. Louis, followed almost exactly the same route as the railroad. Local people called it the ‘hard road.” The new state highway passed along Ladd Street and brought traffic through the center of Pontiac. The 1891 Iron Truss bridge over the Vermilion proved inadequate to carry increased traffic over the river, and in 1925 it was replaced with a new steel and concrete structure. In 1925 the designation of the road was changed to Route 66, but this was only a change in name, as most of this famous highway simply borrowed the pavement of Route 4. Changes brought by the new modes of transport were among the forces that contributed to a re-examination of the past. In Pontiac this took the form of the nationally known Threshermen's Reunion. It started in a modest way in 1949 at Pontiac's Chautauqua Park next to the Vermilion River as a gathering of interested people who brought together a collection of old farm machinery. The assemblage steam engines and the people who ran them grew in popularity. In 1999 the sponsors purchased their own forty acres north of town. In 1966 the first phase of construction on Interstate 55 was finished and in the early 1970s the road, which closely followed Route 66, was brought up to improved federal standards. Highway oriented businesses soon clustered around these roads, at first on the north and south sides of Pontiac, and later near Exit 197, west of the old town center. Unlike many towns, Pontiac has continued to be serviced by railroad passenger service. In 1971 Amtrak took over the task of moving people between Chicago and St. Louis, and Pontiac has continued to be an important stop.

Pontiac is home to the Illinois Route 66 Hall of Fame. It was previously located at Dixie Truckers Home in McLean, Illinois, but was moved to a new, larger location in Pontiac when Dixie changed ownership.

Demographics

As of the census of 2000, there were 11,864 people, 4,139 households, and 2,619 families residing in the city. The racial makeup of the city was 85.39% White, 10.90% African American, 0.19% Native American, 0.43% Asian, 2.06% from other races, and 1.04% from two or more races. Hispanic or Latino of any race were 4.37% of the population.

There were 4,139 households, out of which 31.9% had children under the age of 18 living with them, 47.6% were married couples living together, 11.9% had a female householder with no husband present, and 36.7% were non-families. 31.6% of all households were made up of individuals, and 13.2% had someone living alone who was 65 years of age or older. The average household size was 2.39 and the average family size was 3.00.

In the city, the population was spread out, with 22.9% under the age of 18, 10.6% from 18 to 24, 32.7% from 25 to 44, 20.3% from 45 to 64, and 13.5% who were 65 years of age or older. The median age was 35 years. For every 100 females, there were 120.5 males. For every 100 females age 18 and over, there were 125.6 males.

The median income for a household in the city was $37,593, and the median income for a family was $43,231. Males had a median income of $35,709 versus $22,302 for females. The per capita income for the city was $16,863. About 8.1% of families and 11.7% of the population were below the poverty line, including 13.5% of those under age 18 and 8.9% of those age 65 or over.

Government and infrastructure
The Illinois Department of Corrections Pontiac Correctional Center is located in Pontiac. Pontiac housed the male death row when it was still legal. Prior to the January 11, 2003 commutation of death row sentences, male death row inmates were housed in Pontiac, Menard, and Tamms correctional centers.
Governor Rod Blagojevich threatened to close down this prison in 2008. After the community rose up and protested the closing for many different reasons, the prison closure was averted. 

Media
The city is served by a daily newspaper, The Daily Leader.  Local radio stations include WIBL 107.7 ("The Bull") and WJEZ 98.9.

Education
Pontiac Elementary School District 429 operates public elementary and junior high schools.

Pontiac Township High School District #90 operates Pontiac Township High School.

Attractions

Museums

Pontiac is home to several museums including the Route 66 Hall of Fame and Museum, the Pontiac Oakland Museum, the Livingston County War Museum, the Yost House Museum and Art Center & the International Walldog Mural and Sign Art Museum.

Murals
Downtown Pontiac has a collection of more than 20 murals that depict events, people and places from the history of the town. Included in these murals is a large Route 66 shield that is a popular photo opportunity for tourists from many countries.

Parks 
Pontiac has ten parks in the area, all of which are open to public during normal hours (dawn to dusk). 
 Jaycee Park - 4.6 acre city park with a baseball field, batting cage and playground equipment. Located at 100 N. Pearl Street.
 Play Park - 12.5 acre city park with a boat ramp, playground equipment, Riverview Disc Golf Course and two swinging bridges. Located at 3030 E. Grove Street.
 Dargan Park - 2 acre city park with sculptures, a picnic pavilion and playground equipment. Located at 210 Fountain Street.
 Chautauqua Park - 26.5 acre city park with an auditorium, two picnic pavilions for rent, one picnic pavilion for public use, playground equipment, Riverview Disc Golf Course, and a swinging bridge. Located at 100 Park Street.
 Humiston-Riverside Park - 5 acre city park with playground equipment and swinging bridge. Located at 400 W. Water Street.
 Westview Park - 5.2 acre city park with a picnic pavilion, outdoor basketball court and playground equipment. Located at 1315 Indian Drive.
 Fell Park - 2.3 acre city park with an outdoor basketball court, skate park and playground equipment. Located at 200 N. Vermillion Street.
 Kiwanis-Humiston Park - 1.7 acre city park with five pickleball courts, one tennis court, a softball/baseball field and playground equipment. Located at 1100 S. Division Street.
 Lions Park - 1.3 acre city park with a basketball court, softball/baseball field and playground equipment. Located at 401 E. North Street.
 Recreation Complex' - 60 acre city park with five softball/baseball fields, a football field, four basketball courts, six tennis courts, four sand volleyball pits, dog park and playground equipment. Located at 2104 Old Airport Road.

·

Restaurants
Pontiac has an abundance of restaurants, ranging from large chain corporations to local diners. More information about restaurants in Pontiac, including location, hours, and contact information, can be found at https://localwiki.org/bloomington-normal/Pontiac.

 Notable people 

 Donald Attig, businessman, entrepreneur, inventor, author, and adventurer
 Oscar F. Avery, lawyer and Illinois state senator
 Harry Bay, outfielder for the Cincinnati Reds and Cleveland Bronchos/Naps
 E. Wayne Craven, art historian
 Emily Grove, pole vaulter
 Moira Harris, actress and wife of Gary Sinise.
 William C. Harris, Illinois state legislator and businessman
 Irene Hunt, Newbery Medal winning author
 Frank L. Pinckney, second Illinois Fighting Illini men's basketball head coach from 1906 to 1907
 Dan Rutherford, past Illinois Treasurer (2011-2015)
 Mark Schwahn, screenwriter, director and producer
 Patricia Tallman, actress and stuntwoman
 Natashia Williams, actress

Transportation
Pontiac, Illinois (Amtrak station)
 Pontiac Municipal Airport (KPNT) is 3 miles north of the town
Good Times Taxi

In popular culture
Scenes from "Chained Heat," an episode of the TV series Revolution, were set in Pontiac. C. Thomas Howell appeared in the episode, he starred in "Grandview, U.S.A.".

In the TV series Supernatural'', Jimmy Novak and his family live in Pontiac. Jimmy Novak is the vessel of the angel Castiel; Jimmy has been 'dead' for some time, but Castiel continues to use his body to interact with human beings. While protagonist Dean Winchester was dead in between seasons three and four he was buried in Pontiac, IL and most of the first episode of season four takes place in Pontiac, although the places were all fictional with no real world counterparts in the genuine Pontiac.

References

External links

City website
Residents Portal Site

 
Cities in Illinois
Cities in Livingston County, Illinois
Micropolitan areas of Illinois
County seats in Illinois
Populated places established in 1837
1837 establishments in Illinois